Sunny Days may refer to:

Music
 Sunny Days (group), a South Korean girl group

Albums
 Sunny Days (album), by Allure, 2001
 Sunny Days, by Dou Wei, 1995
 Sunny Days, or the title song, by Lighthouse, 1972

Songs
 "Sunny Days" (Jars of Clay song), 2004
 "Sunny Days" (Kid British song), 2009
 "Sunny Days" (Armin van Buuren song), 2017

Other media
 Sunny Days (film), a 2011 Kazakhstani film
 Sunny Days: The Children's Television Revolution That Changed America, a 2020 book by David Kamp
 Sunny Days, a 1976 autobiography by Sunil Gavaskar

See also 
 
 
 Sunny Day (disambiguation)